Vítkovce is a village and municipality in the Spišská Nová Ves District in the Košice Region of central-eastern Slovakia.

The village is located in the southern part of the Hornádska basin and in the northern part of the Galmus mountain range.

History
In historical records the village was first mentioned in 1279.

Geography
The village lies at an altitude of 406 metres and covers an area of 5.217 km².
It has a population of about 520 people.

References

External links
http://en.e-obce.sk/obec/vitkovce/vitkovce.html
https://web.archive.org/web/20070927203415/http://www.statistics.sk/mosmis/eng/run.html 
http://spis.eu.sk/vitkovce/sk

Villages and municipalities in Spišská Nová Ves District